The 2007–08 Segunda División de México season was split in two tournaments Apertura and Clausura. Segunda División was the third-tier football league of Mexico. The season was played between 17 August 2007 and 25 May 2008. 

This was the last season in which the Segunda División was played in a unified league, a situation that was repeated until the 2020–21 edition, starting in August 2008, the Second Division was divided into two leagues: Liga Premier de Ascenso and Liga de Nuevos Talentos.

Teams

South Zone

Central Zone 
{{Location map+ |Mexico |width=700|float=right |caption=Location of teams in the 2007–08 Segunda División Central Zone |places=

{{Location map~ |Mexico|mark=TransparentPlaceholder.png |marksize=1 |lat=24|long=-117|label=}}

Bajío Zone

Western Zone

Northern Zone

Torneo Apertura

Regular season

Southern Zone

League table

Results

Central Zone

League table

Results

Bajío Zone

League table

Results

Western Zone

League table

Results

Northern Zone

League table

Results

Liguilla de Ascenso

Round of 16

First leg

Second leg

Quarter-finals

First leg

Second leg

Semi-finals

First leg

Second leg

Final

First leg

Second leg

Liguilla de Filiales

Torneo Clausura

Regular season

Southern Zone

League table

Results

Central Zone

League table

Results

Bajío Zone

League table

Results

Western Zone

League table

Results

Northern Zone

League table

Results

Liguilla de Ascenso

Round of 16

First leg

Second leg

Quarter-finals

First leg

Second leg

Semi-finals

First leg

Second leg

Final

First leg

Second leg

Liguilla de Filiales

Promotion Final 
The Promotion Final is a series of matches played by the champions of the tournaments Apertura and Clausura, the game is played to determine the winning team of the promotion to Liga de Ascenso. 
The first leg was played on 22 May 2008, and the second leg was played on 25 May 2008.

First leg

Second leg 

Pachuca Juniors was the winner of the promotion to Primera División A, however, being a reserve team from Pachuca its license was put up for sale, finally the C.D. Irapuato bought the rights and was therefore promoted to the upper category.

See also 
Primera División de México Apertura 2007
Primera División de México Clausura 2008
2007–08 Primera División A season

References

External links 
 Official website of Liga Premier
 Magazine page  

Segunda División de México seasons
1